Uttara Export Processing Zone (UEPZ), also known as Uttara EPZ or Nilphamari EPZ, is the seventh of the eight export processing zone in Bangladesh located at Nilphamari.   It's the only export processing zone of Rangpur division/ north Bengal. It was established in September 2001on about 213,66 acres of lands in Sangloshi area in Nilphamari town.

Industrial plot
There are more than 180 industrial plots in this EPZ. Allocation of 138 plots has been completed. 12 plots are running. 33 plots undeveloped and 09 plots are empty.

Company
1. Evergreen Products Factory (BD) Ltd. 
2. Ventura Leatherware MFY (BD) Ltd. 
3. Sonic (Bangladesh) Ltd. 
4. Mazen (Bangladesh) Industries Ltd. 
5. Kord (BD) Ltd 6. Dong Jin Industrial (BD) Company Ltd. 
7. EPF Printing Ltd 
8. Oasis Transformation Ltd. 
9. EPF Cartoon Ltd. 
10. DESHBANDHU TEXTILES MILLS LTD 
11. EXPO LINK IND. LTD 
12. NILPHAMARI PACKAGING LTD 
13. Section Seven International Limited 
14. Uttara Sweater Manufacturing Company Limited 
15. Viyellatex Apparels Ltd. 
16. Independent Export (BD) Ltd. 
17. Glorious Export BD Ltd. 
18. SKY Star IND. LTD. 
19. Fardin Accessories Limited 
20. Quest Accessories (BD) Ltd. 
21. TN Accessories Ltd.
22. Padma Spining & Composite

See also
 Bangladesh Export Processing Zone Authority
 Nilphamari District

References

Uttara
Foreign trade of Bangladesh
Nilphamari District
Industrial parks